Gaston Therrien (born May 27, 1960) is a Canadian former professional ice hockey player who played 22 games in the National Hockey League for the Quebec Nordiques between 1981 and 1983. He works for Réseau des sports (RDS), a sportscasting channel in Quebec. Therrien was born in Montreal, Quebec. As a youth, he played in the 1973 Quebec International Pee-Wee Hockey Tournament with a minor ice hockey team from Rosemont, Quebec.

Career statistics

Regular season and playoffs

References

External links
 

1960 births
Living people
SC Bern players
Canadian ice hockey coaches
Canadian ice hockey defencemen
Diables Noirs de Tours players
Erie Golden Blades players
Fredericton Express players
French Quebecers
HC Villars players
Ice hockey people from Montreal
Montreal Rocket coaches
Ours de Villard-de-Lans players
Quebec Nordiques draft picks
Quebec Nordiques players
Quebec Remparts players
Rimouski Océanic coaches
Rochester Americans players
Viry-Châtillon EH players